Affectio societatis is the common will of several legal persons or legal entities to merge into one entity. It is a key characteristic of a company under French law. Articles 1832 and 1833 of the French Civil Code form the basis of this principle, although since there is no statutory definition, it has also been shaped by jurisprudence.

References

French business law
Latin legal terminology